Mário Figueira Fernandes (born 19 September 1990) is a professional footballer who plays as a right-back for Internacional on loan from CSKA Moscow. Born in Brazil, he represented the Russia national team.

Club career

Grêmio
Fernandes joined Grêmio in March 2009, signing until 2014. A few days later, he disappeared, and Brazilian police were called in to search for him. He was found some days later in São Paulo state, after having withdrawn cash in Londrina, Porto Alegre and Florianópolis. Fernandes made his debut for the club against Sport on 28 June 2009. Fernandes established himself as Grêmio's first-choice right back.

CSKA Moscow
On 25 April 2012, the Grêmio president announced that a 15 million euro deal had been agreed with CSKA Moscow and Fernandes was set to join them pending a medical examination, with CSKA announcing the arrival on 4 May 2012.

During the 2013–14 campaign he suffered a knee injury ruling him out for the first four months of the season.

In 2015, he was a key player in the Champions League 3rd qualifying round – CSKA Moscow won the second leg against Sparta Prague 3–2. Fernandes played 90 minutes, after 64 minutes (2:2) and after a run of the mill challenge Fernandes made a simulated dive, referee Paolo Mazzoleni showed Marek Matějovský the red card. Russian daily Kommersant wrote it was "An important theatre piece". Czech newspapers claimed the play was certainly not card worthy and Fernandes lacked fair play.

On 29 June 2017, Fernandes signed a new contract with CSKA, keeping him at the club until the summer of 2022.

On 18 May 2022, Fernandes announced that he would be suspending his contract with CSKA following their last game of the 2021–22 season against Rostov on 21 May 2022 for personal reasons. On 11 December 2022, CSKA announced that Fernandes had decided to resume his playing career, whilst also remaining in Brazil for 2023.

Internacional
On 13 December 2022, Internacional announced the signing of Fernandes from CSKA Moscow for the 2023 season. CSKA Moscow announced the transfer as a year-long loan.

International career

Brazil
In 2011, Fernandes was called to the Brazil squad for the game Superclásico de las Américas, which he rejected, saying he was having some personal problems that was encountered in issues. Fernandes went on to make his debut, and only appearance for Brazil in a 4–0 friendly victory against Japan on 14 October 2014.

Russia
After acquiring Russian citizenship, he was called up to the Russia national football team for the friendly games against Turkey on 31 August 2016 and Ghana on 6 September 2016. However, at that point, he had only been a CSKA Moscow player since April 2012, which meant he had not lived in Russia continuously for at least five years yet. Thus, he was not eligible to play for Russia until April 2017.

On 23 March 2017, it was announced that he would make his debut for Russia on 24 March in a friendly against Ivory Coast. He did not appear in that game. He made his debut for Russia on 7 October 2017 in a friendly game against South Korea.

On 11 May 2018, he was included in Russia's extended 2018 FIFA World Cup squad. On 3 June 2018, he was included in the finalized World Cup squad.
He played a key role in Russia's performance at the 2018 FIFA World Cup. In the quarter finals against Croatia, he scored an equalising goal in extra time, which sent the match to a penalty shootout. However, Russia was eliminated after losing the shootout, in which he failed to score.

On 11 May 2021, he was included in the preliminary extended 30-man squad for UEFA Euro 2020. On 2 June 2021, he was included in the final squad. He played the full match in Russia's opening game against Belgium on 12 June 2021 as Russia lost 0–3. He started the second group game against Finland but got injured and substituted in the 26th minute after landing awkwardly contesting an aerial ball. He recovered for the last group game against Denmark on 21 June and played a full game as Russia lost 1–4 and was eliminated.

On 13 September 2021 he announced his retirement from the national team.

Personal life
Fernandes was born in São Paulo. Right after signing his first professional contract with Grêmio, Fernandes found it hard to adjust to a new home and fell into depression, prompting him to disappear to his uncle. The police found him in a dishevelled state nearly 700 miles away from Porto Alegre, hungry and exhausted. In a later interview he refused to disclose why he made no attempt to contact the club during this time, but pointed out the difficulties of settling at the beginning of a career, citing the example of Jesús Navas. He underwent psychotherapy to deal with his depression, which helped his performances, but still drank heavily, regularly went out clubbing, and neglected his diet and fitness, saying "I would drink so much that I would sometimes show up drunk to training". During this time he lived alone, and in an interview admitted to "eating pizza and McDonald's every day", which led to action on the part of the Gremio dietitian.

Fernandes had spoken with CSKA CEO Roman Babaev about the possibility of receiving Russian citizenship in 2015, before he had been called up to the Brazil squad. His talks about receiving Russian citizenship resumed in the autumn of the same year, at which point he had decided and had the full support of his family to do so. On 13 July 2016, he received Russian citizenship via presidential decree from Vladimir Putin, which according to him made him more determined to start for Russia in the World Cup. His younger brother, Jô, is also a footballer.

As of 2017, Fernandes spoke very little Russian, but stated his intent to learn the language and the national anthem.

Career statistics

Club

International
Appearances and goals by national team and year

As of match played 30 March 2021. Russia score listed first, score column indicates score after each Fernandes goal.

Honours
Grêmio
Campeonato Gaúcho: 2010

CSKA Moscow
Russian Premier League: 2012–13, 2013–14, 2015–16
Russian Cup: 2012–13
Russian Super Cup: 2014, 2018

Individual
 Silver Ball: 2011
 Campeonato Gaúcho Team of the Championship: 2010
 CSKA Fans' Player of the Year: 2018–19
 Russian Premier League Best Right back: 2013–14, 2014–15, 2016–17, 2018–19, 2020–21, 2021–22

References

External links

Profile on CSKA Moscow website
Profile on Grêmio Foot-Ball Porto Alegrense website
goal.com

1990 births
Living people
People from São Caetano do Sul
Russian footballers
Russia international footballers
Brazil international footballers
Brazilian footballers
Brazilian emigrants to Russia
Naturalised citizens of Russia
Grêmio Foot-Ball Porto Alegrense players
PFC CSKA Moscow players
Sport Club Internacional players
Brazilian expatriate footballers
Expatriate footballers in Russia
Brazilian expatriate sportspeople in Russia
Campeonato Brasileiro Série A players
Russian Premier League players
Dual internationalists (football)
Association football defenders
Russian people of Brazilian descent
2018 FIFA World Cup players
UEFA Euro 2020 players
Footballers from São Paulo (state)